Chambord is a municipality in Le Domaine-du-Roy Regional County Municipality in the Saguenay–Lac-Saint-Jean region of Quebec, Canada. The Chambord meteorite was found near here in 1904.

The municipality also includes the community of Val-Jalbert, located along Quebec Route 169 between the village of Chambord itself and Roberval.

Transportation
Chambord is at the intersection of Quebec highways 155 and 169, and is also served by the Montreal – Jonquière train passenger train of Via Rail Canada, which operates between Montreal and Jonquière.

Demographics
Population trend:
 Population in 2011: 1773 (2006 to 2011 population change: 4.9%)
 Population in 2006: 1690
 Population in 2001: 1693
 Population in 1996: 1784
 Population in 1991: 1739

Private dwellings occupied by usual residents: 758 (total dwellings: 1189)

Mother tongue:
 English as first language: 0.6%
 French as first language: 98.8%
 English and French as first language: 0.6%
 Other as first language: 0%

Tourism
The historical village of Val-Jalbert is Chambord's main tourist attraction. There is also an annual cowboy festival.

References

External links 

  Municipalité de Chambord
 Festival du cowboy de Chambord

Municipalities in Quebec
Incorporated places in Saguenay–Lac-Saint-Jean